Lachlan Robert Tua Jackson (born 12 March 1995) is an Australian professional footballer who plays as a centre-back for K League 1 club Suwon.

Club career

Brisbane Roar
Jackson made his senior professional debut against the Melbourne Victory, entering the match as a substitute for the fatigued Luke DeVere in the 84th minute, a game which the Roar lost 2–1. Jackson continued his playing by being a starting player in the penultimate clash against the Victory at Suncorp Stadium, and proved to be a bulwark in defence despite the Roar going down 1–0 in spite of a controversial penalty. He was again chosen for the terminal match of the season, a clash against the Newcastle Jets again at Suncorp Stadium. Kofi Danning opened the scoring in the 71st minute, but the Roar couldn't prevent Edson Montaño from equalising. In the dying minutes of the match, Jet's custodian Ben Kennedy saved a shot from youthful winger Shannon Brady, yet Jackson was there to collect the rebound and finished clinically into the left corner.

Newcastle Jets
On 13 July 2015, the Newcastle Jets secured the signature of Jackson on a one-season deal. Jackson made a total of 18 appearances in his first season at Newcastle, playing at both centre back and full back throughout the year. Jackson's solid performances throughout his first season with Newcastle earned him a one-year contract extension. On 3 June 2021, the Jets announced Jackson had departed on mutual consent after accepting a deal to player overseas.

Suwon FC
In July 2021, Jackson signed for South Korean club Suwon FC.

External links

References

1995 births
Living people
Association football defenders
Australian soccer players
Brisbane Roar FC players
Newcastle Jets FC players
Suwon FC players
A-League Men players
National Premier Leagues players